Yung-su Tsai (born 1 February 1930 in Yuli, Hualien, Taiwan) is a Taiwan-born American theoretical particle physicist who was a professor at Stanford University and was noted for his work at the SLAC National Accelerator Laboratory and specifically the discovery of the tau lepton.

References

1930 births
Living people
Particle physicists
People from Hualien County